Kurt Walter Donsbach (1935-2021) was an unlicensed chiropractor and a controversial alternative medicine figure who was twice convicted of practicing medicine without a license.  At other times he also faced charges of misbranding drugs for sale, unlawfully dispensing drugs as a cure for cancer, tax evasion, practicing medicine without a license, and falsely representing a cure for cancer.

Background 
After working for Royal Lee, a controversial supplements manufacturer, Donsbach founded his own store in the late 1960s. In 1971, Donsbach was prosecuted for misrepresenting a series of herbal medicines and supplements by falsely claiming that they could cure a number of diseases, including cancer and heart disease. He was fined and placed on probation. In 1973, he was convicted a second time on similar charges, and again was fined and placed on probation - which he subsequently violated the following year, resulting in another fine.

After selling his business, Donsbach joined the unaccredited Union University of Los Angeles as their new Dean of the Department of Nutrition, before founding his own unaccredited Donsbach University, which gained a reputation as a producer of false diplomas in the health and nutrition field. Along with Donsbach University, Donsbach also created the International Academy of Nutritional Consultants, which in 1983 gained brief notoriety from the Washington Post when caught issuing nutrition counseling credentials to a tabby cat whose assistants had submitted incomplete paperwork.

Donsbach was the founder of Hospital Santa Monica in Rosarito, Baja California, Mexico. Following the death of Coretta Scott King while under treatment at the clinic in January 2006, the facility was shut down by Mexican health officials.

Donsbach was charged and found guilty of tax evasion and the smuggling of illegal medications in 1996.

On April 9, 2009, Donsbach was arrested during his Internet radio health show and charged with 11 felony counts, including dispensing unapproved drugs. Prosecutors also charged Donsbach with offering neuropeptides to his patients. These drugs contained nimesulide, which have been banned in Europe because they cause high rates of liver failure and have resulted in some deaths. In January 2010, a San Diego judge ruled there was enough evidence for the case against Donsbach to proceed to trial. Donsbach faced up to 12 years and eight months if convicted. The case ended with a plea deal with Donsbach facing up to a year in jail, followed by probation.

On December 13, 2010, Donsbach pleaded guilty to 13 additional felony charges, including practicing medicine without a license and selling misbranded drugs.

Donsbach's activities have repeatedly been criticized by Dr. Stephen Barrett of Quackwatch.

References

External links
Donsbach Foundation

Living people
1935 births
American chiropractors
American people convicted of tax crimes
Medical controversies in the United States
People convicted for health fraud
Pseudoscientific diet advocates
American people convicted of drug offenses